Epinysson mellipes is a species of wasp in the family Crabronidae. It is found in North America.

References

Further reading

 
 
 

Crabronidae
Insects described in 1882